Helena Kallianiotes (born March 24, 1938) is a Greek-American film actress. In 1973, she was nominated for the Golden Globe Award for Best Supporting Actress – Motion Picture for her role as Jackie Burdette in Kansas City Bomber.

Career overview
During the late 1960s Helena Kallianiotes was the resident belly dancer at The Intersection, a Greek restaurant in North Hollywood, Los Angeles, California. This engagement led to her first film appearance as an uncredited belly dancer in the 1968 film Head, directed by Bob Rafelson and starring The Monkees. Kallianiotes was later cast in another Rafelson film, Five Easy Pieces, starring Jack Nicholson and Karen Black, in which she played Palm Apodaca, a neurotic, foul-mouthed "butch" hitch-hiker, traveling with her companion played by Toni Basil. In 1972, Kallianiotes appeared in her most celebrated role as the ultra-aggressive roller derby skater Jackie Burdette in Kansas City Bomber, for which she received a Best Supporting Actress nomination for the 1973 Golden Globe Awards. Her other film roles include Mata Hari in Shanks (1974), Elaine Reavis in The Drowning Pool (1975), Anita in Stay Hungry, the Visionary Woman in The Passover Plot (both 1976), and a future-reading brothel madam in Nicolas Roeg's Eureka (1983).

Life outside of film
In 1975 Kallianiotes appeared on the cover of Art Garfunkel's Breakaway album.

In 1985, she opened a private members-only club in Los Angeles called Helena's.

Filmography

References

External links
 

American film actresses
Living people
1938 births
Belly dancers
Greek emigrants to the United States
20th-century American actresses
American female dancers
American dancers
21st-century American women